These are lists of animated television series first aired in the 2020s, organized by year:

List of animated television series of 2020
List of animated television series of 2021
List of animated television series of 2022
List of animated television series of 2023
List of animated television series of 2024
List of animated television series of 2025
List of animated television series of 2026
List of animated television series of 2027
List of animated television series of 2028
List of animated television series of 2029

 
Animated series